Nissedal is a rural municipality in Telemark in the county of Vestfold og Telemark in Norway. It is part of the traditional regions of Upper Telemark and Vest-Telemark. The administrative centre of the municipality is the village of Treungen.  The municipality of Nissedal was established on January 1, 1838 (see formannskapsdistrikt). As of 2018, Nissedal is home to 1,489 full-time residents and 2,246 vacation homes.

Nissedal has been nicknamed the Telemark Riviera due to its close proximity to Gautefall Alpine Center, and due to its many campgrounds and places for outdoor activities. There is a total of 1,750 lakes in Nissedal, including Nisser Lake, the seventh-largest lake in Norway, which Nissedal is named after. Gautefall, which is home to Telemark County’s largest alpine center, lies adjacent to the municipality. For residents of cities near the Oslo Fjord, Gautefall is the nearest winter sport destination.

Nissedal’s terrain is characterized by roche moutonnée rock formations, mountains, valleys, forests, wetlands, and lakes. Nissedal is a popular destination for outdoor activities such as paddling, fishing, swimming, mountain biking, hiking, kayaking, skiing, boating, and more. It is recognized as one of Norway’s best places for mountain climbing. It is home to Hægefjell, one of Norway’s most popular mountain climbing destinations.

The municipality is bordered by Fyresdal to the west, Kviteseid to the north, Drangedal to the east, and Gjerstad, Vegårshei and Åmli municipalities to the south.

General information

Etymology 

Nissedal was first mentioned in a written source in the 1300s under the name Nizudal. The current written form first emerged in the 1400s. Nissedal is named after Nisser Lake, which is the largest lake in Telemark County. The modern form of the name stems from Old Norse Nizidalr. The first element is the name of the lake Nizir, possibly from *Nið-sær, which is now called Nisser, and the last element is dalr "valley, dale".

The name Nissedal derives from "Nidserdal". Today, the name Nissedal refers to three geographical areas: 1) the municipality of Nissedal, 2) Nissedal parish with the villages on both sides of Nisser Lake, and 3) the villages of Nordbygda and Kyrkjebygda that are jointly named "Nissedal village".

Coat of arms 
The coat of arms was granted on October 30, 1992, and was designed by Halvor Holtskog jr. The arms shows three red nisseluer, traditional red woolen hats often associated with the nisse, which were commonly worn until the late 19th century by farmers and common folk. It is a canting arms, as the name Nissedal has been "translated" into a visual pun with the three woolen hats, in spite of the name having nothing to do with the folkloric nisse.

History

Nissedal has been populated for over 10,000 years. It was likely one of the first areas in Telemark to be inhabited, likely by people migrating from the south and southwest after the Ice Age. Most artifacts retrieved in Nissedal are dated to the Iron Age. However, older traces such as cairns, arrowheads, and stone axes have also been retrieved. Two ancient rock paintings can still be seen on the western shore of Lake Nisser, including paintings at Kvithamar by Fjone and at Trontveit further south. Bronze Age artifacts include swords and keys, while there are large burial mounds found in Fjone ("Kjempehaugane"). The ancient burial mounds have a diameter of 15–20 meters and are dated to the Iron Age.

One of the earliest areas to be populated in Nissedal was the cave Holmevasshelleren, approximately 40 meters (44 yards) from the lake Holmevatn at Kyrkjebygdheia. Archeological discoveries have dated prehistoric settlements at Holmevasshelleren to Neolithic times, 3800 BCE-6000 BCE. The cave is 18 meters long, four meters high, and three meters deep.

Ancient rock paintings from the Bronze Age can be seen at various sites in Nissedal, including by a steep mountain by Trontveit farm on the western side of the lake Nisser. Such paintings are also found by Kvithamar further north. The rock art site at Kvithammaren ("The White Crag") is named for the site where it is painted, namely a white niche in the mountainside, roughly 3–4 meters (10–13 ft.) above the surface of Nisser Lake, at the foot of a 50-meter high cliff. It is easily visible from distance and may have been seen as openings in Earth and a link to the underworld. The other rock painting by Nisser Lake is known as Ovnen ("The Oven") and is located at the foot of a 20-meter high escarpment which originally jutted up in front of the panel. This painting depicts a row of human figures, an animal pictograph, and a pattern of zigzag lines. A local clergyman visited the paintings in the early 1800s and claimed the human figures at Ovnen to have been drawn by a monk in the memory of a bridal procession that drowned. Their colloquial name, Munkeskrifta ("The Monk’s Drawings"), is a reference to this. The paintings at Ovnen are naturally filled in iron oxides.

An ancient archeological monument from the Bronze Age, dating to 1800 BCE-500 BCE, can also be seen by Stolsvasslonene. It is a solar symbol of a sun wheel which is 40-centimeter in diameter. It can be reached by hiking the DNT trail between Uvdalen and Gautefall. It is likely an ancient symbol of fertility and possibly related to the nearby lake.

Heigeitilen, a boundary marker on the border between the three parishes Tørdal, Nissedal and Treungen, was first mentioned in written sources in 1792. It is likely an ancient marker and can be reached from the Heigeitilløypa trail (Heigeitilstien). It is a Milky Quartz mineral rock.

The valley known as Uvdalen has been populated since the Stone Age. Protected from the wind by the mountain Heitfjell, the area was likely inhabited for hundreds of years. Archeological surveys here have retrieved various artifacts from the Stone Age, including arrowheads and flint tools. The first written record of inhabitants in Uvdalen dates to 1574, while the last permanent inhabitants left the valley in 1910. The 1733 census indicates that Bjørn Alvson and his wife Torbjørg lived on a farm here with nine cows, 42 sheep, 16 goats, and two horses, among other animals. The 1865 census showed a total population of 24 in Uvdalen. Uvdalen was once home to one of the largest farms in Treungen.

Reinsvasshytta by the lake Reinsvatn was built in 1900 by Amboritius Olsen Lindvig and was Gautefallheia's first cabin.

In the 20th century, a number of dams were constructed at various lakes throughout Nissedal. Constructed by Sveinung Solli in 1900, the dam Bjønntjønndammen above Bjønntjønnfossen waterfall was in use until the 1960s. It is located by Bjønntjønn ("Bear Lake") in the valley known as Bjønntjønndalen. The dam by nearby Mjåvatn, Mjåvassdammen, was also constructed around the year 1900 and was in use until the late 1960s. Another dam was constructed by Holmevassosen at the lake Holmevatn at Kyrkjebygdheia in 1965.

Economy

Important industries in Nissedal are farming, forestry, fur farming, power supply and tourism. Forestry has been the most important industry in Nissedal since the 1600s. Berry collection was an important industry in the 1920s and 1930s, when berries were exported from Nissedal to Great Britain.

In recent years, tourism and the construction of vacation homes have become an important industry and largely replaced the fur farming industry. There were 2200 vacation homes in Nissedal in 2016, compared to a permanent population of 1476 inhabitants.

Hydropower remains an important industry in Nissedal. Aust-Agder Kraftverk has produced electricity here since 1919. Agder Energi has five stations in Treungen and Skagerak Energi has facilities in Fjone.

Two grocery stores are located in Treungen, SPAR and Coop Prix.

Culture
Treungenfestival is an annual music festival attracting over 12,000 visitors per year.

Z Museum is located in Treungen and has exhibits of veteran cars and an over 1000-year-old wooden boat. The museum also has Norway's biggest collection of ancient telephones. An additional museum, Sputnik Museum, is located nearby on the property of country music singer Sputnik (Knut T. Storbukås) in Bostrak. He was awarded Artist of the Year in 1990 by Dagbladet and is listed in the Guinness Book of Records. His collection of over 36 silver, gold, diamond, and platinum records are among the exhibits at the museum. The museum is notable for having a rocket placed on its rooftop.

Government

Nissedal was originally a part of Kviteseid parish until Nissedal established its own parish in 1810. In 1837, Nissedal also became a separate municipality.

Municipal council
The municipal council (Kommunestyre) of Nissedal is made up of 17 representatives that are elected to four year terms.  As of 2017, the party breakdown is as follows:

Geography

Nissedal is a municipality covering an area of 908 km2 (350.5 sq. ft.) in Telemark County. It is centered on the less rugged eastern shore of Nisser Lake. Nissedal municipality borders Kviteseid to the north, Fyresdal to the west, Drangedal (Gautefall) and Gjerstad to the east, and borders Vegårshei and Åmli to the south. Nisser Lake, which is 40 kilometres in length and 250 meters deep, is the largest in the county and the seventh-largest lake in Norway.

Nissedal is one of the municipalities with the most vacation homes in Norway. Nissedal is home to three times more cabins than residential homes as of 2018: 2,350 cabins and 735 houses.

The only urban area is the village of Treungen, while minor settlements include Tveitsund, Felle, Nordbygda, Fjone, and Kyrkjebygda. While the village of Treungen is by far the largest settlement (with a population of 500), Felle with 100 residents is the second-largest settlement in Nissedal. Treungen is located by the southernmost part of Lake Nisser, the largest in Telemark. Treungen lies where the river Nidelva begins, a river that flows by Haugsjåhund, Åmli, and Arendal before discharging into the ocean near Arendal. Treungen is surrounded by tall mountains such as Baremlandsfjellet (Skuggenatten), Sollifjell, Husfjell, and Skålefjell.

Telemark Road (Norwegian National Road 41) passes through Treungen- and Kyrkjebygda villages in Nissedal.

The highest peak is Førheinutane at 1,049 m. (3,441 ft.).

Nature preserves

Solhomfjell and Kvenntjønnane are two nature preserves located on the border between Gjerstad and Nissedal. In 1993, the 23,400 decares (9 sq. mi.) Solhomfjell Nature Preserve was established near the valley Uvdalen. This preserve was expanded in 2005 and includes plateaus, roche moutonnée rock formations, valleys, swamps, along with forests of Wych-elm, Oak and Littleleaf linden trees. Another nearby preserve, Kvenntjønnane Nature Preserve, is located nearby on top of Mjeltenatten. This 12,000 decares (4.6 sq. mi.) preserve was established in 2009 with the purpose of protecting the untouched nature with its wide biological diversity of various types of nature, ecosystems, and species. Although the main trailhead for these preserves is located at Felehovet on Gautefallheia, there are also trails here from the lakes Feletjønn and Bjønntjønn in Nissedal.

Other nature preserves in Nissedal include Lytingsdalen (established in 1989), Vidmyr (1975), and Heitfjell (2005). Lytingsdalen Nature Preserve was established to protect its untouched landscape and its wildlife and flora. Several pine trees at Lytingsdalen are over 500 years old. Vidmyr was established to protect its marsh-type landscape of suboceanic character. The flora here includes species such as purple moor-grass and bog asphodel.

Climate
Nissedal has a temperate oceanic climate (Cfb by the Köppen-Geiger system). If  is used as winter threshold as in US, Nissedal has a humid continental climate. The all-time high temperature  has been recorded in all three summer months - June 1970, July 1991 and August 1975. The all-time low is  recorded 9 February 1966. Precipitation is fairly evenly spread out over the year, with significant precipitation also in the driest months. The wettest months are August - November, and the driest months are February - April. The Tveitsund weather station has been recording since 1944.

Demographics

Nissedal is the second-least populated municipality in Telemark. According to Statistics Norway, Nissedal was home to 1,489 inhabitants in 2017, but had 2,246 cabins. 28.2 percent of local residents lived on agricultural- or forestry properties. 74.3 percent were members of Church of Norway as of 2017, while 10.7 percent were members of another religious community. The largest immigrant groups in 2018 (first and second generation) were from the Netherlands (35 people), Syria (22), Poland (21) and Denmark (16).

Nissedal reached its highest population in the year 1850 when 1800 people resided in Nissedal. Large-scale emigration to the United States took place from 1840. Today, there are more people originating from Nissedal in the U.S. than in Norway.

During the winter holiday season, Nissedal's population triples and occasionally quadruples.

Recreation

Located adjacent to Gautefall, Telemark County’s largest alpine center, Nissedal is primarily a winter destination. It is home to six cross-country skiing trails (loipes), including trails connecting Nissedal and Gautefall. Cross-country skiing trails are found throughout Nissedal, including at Kykjebygdheia, Fjone Høgfjell, Felle, Gautefallheia, and Vrådal. Opportunities for alpine skiing, snowblading, snowboarding, Telemark skiing, and mountain skiing are found at Vrådal Ski Center and Gautefall Alpine Center. Over 100 km (62 mi.) of marked cross country skiing trails are found at adjacent Gautefall.

Summer activities include fishing, swimming, mountain climbing, hiking, mountain biking, kayaking, camping, and more. Many of Nissedal's 1,750 lakes are used for fishing, including Nisser Lake. The sandy shores of Nisser Lake is used for sunbathing, while the lake is used for swimming, boating, fishing and more. Perch, Trout, Lavaret and Arctic char are some of the fish species found in the lake. At the last count in 1991, Nisser Lake was home to 3.9 million fish. The fishing license in Fjone gives access to 20 lakes used for fishing as well as use of recreational boats and various lean-to and lavvos used for lodging. Lake Nisser is a popular destination for boating, canoeing, kayaking, and fishing.

There are boat rentals by Nisser Lake, at Tjørull, and the Nidelva (River Nid). A ferry, Fjoneferja (M/F "Nissen"), has been operating at Nisser Lake since 1947 and is Norway's smallest cable ferry or the only cable ferry to still be operating in Norway. It is one of few remaining active cable ferries in Norway, and connects Sundesodden to Fjone. Rock carvings, burial mounds and other remains of ancient civilization have been discovered surrounding Nisser Lake.

Campgrounds include Sandnesodden, Vik (north of Kykjebygda), and   Nisser Hyttegrend and Camping.

Skiing
Popular destinations for skiing include Fjone Høgfjell, Kyrkjebygdheia Skisenter, near Breilivatn at Kyrkjebygdheia, at Baksås, Nordbø Skileikanlegg, and Alpinbakken and Ljosløypa in Treungen. There are a total of 45 km of cross-country skiing trails at Felle with trails leading over mountains such as Havrefjell and Vedlausfjell. Vrådal Alpine and Ski Center is used for both cross country skiing and alpine skiing. This center lies in-between Vråvatn and Nisser.

Mountain climbing

Nissedal is one of Norway's most popular destinations for mountain climbing. Roughly twenty mountains are regularly used for climbing and Hægefjell is the most hiked mountain in Nissedal. Other attractions include mountains such as Ånundsbufjellet, Langfjell, Skålfjell and Baremslandsfjellet. Hægefjell has since the late 1980s become one of the most popular sites for mountain climbing in Norway. The mountain, which has been featured in the TV series 71 Degrees North in 2010, has around 50 different hiking trails. It has an elevation of 1,021 m. (3,349 ft.). From Hægefjell are views of Lake Nisser and Vrådal in the northeast, Nordbygda and Kyrkjebygda in the southeast, Fyresdal and Setesdalsheiene in the west, and as far as Seljord and Gaustatoppen in the north. The most popular trail on Hægefjell Mountain is Via Lara.

Hiking trails
Nissedal is home to a wide range of cross-country skiing trails and hiking trails, including 39 peak trails. Some of these include Havrefjell, Grønlifjell, Reinvassnuten, Skornetten, Hægefjell, and Skuggenatten in Treungen. While the trail to the mountain Havrefjell also has trailheads by Bjønntjønn Lake and Gautefall Alpine Center, the closest trail is found in the village of Felle.

A large number of trailheads are found near the lake Bjønntjønn, including trails maintained by the Norwegian Trekking Association leading to Felehovet, Mjåvassdammen, Havrefjell, and Reinvassnuten. There are also trails from Bjønntjønn to Gautefall Tourist Hotel and lakes such as Øverlandsvatnet and Østre Breivatn. The trail Heigeitilløypa, which has its trailhead at Gautefall Biathlon, leads to Jørundskårheia, Gråndalsfjell mountain, and Djupvatn Lake, before reaching the seter Holmvasstøylen by Holmvatn Lake at Kyrkjebygdheia. A dirt road leads from the lake down to the village center in Kyrkjebygda. Heigeitilløypa trail is named for the ancient boundary marker Heigeitilen.

Mountain biking
Over 100 km of mountain bike trails are located in Nissedal. Some popular trailheads are found at Felehovet and Heimdal. The area between Heimdalsheia and Gautefallheia is particularly popular for mountain biking. In 2010, Canvas Hotel was established at Heimdal and is constructed as a Mongolian Yurt. The hotel was established for mountain bikers and is situated far into the wilderness and connected to over 100 km (62 mi.) of biking trails. The hotel was established by Jan Fasting, the person behind the TV series 71 Degrees North. The hotel has a Maldivian dock with its own fireplace situated in the nearby lake Øytjønnane.

An additional biking trail follows the old train tracks between Treungen and Åmli.

Swimming
Lake Nisser is the lake with the most sandy beaches of any lake in Norway. Sandy beaches are found by several lakes, including Sandnesodden at Nisser, which is the longest sandy beach in Nissedal. A campground is located on this beach. Other beaches include Sommarsletta in Treungen, Haugsjåsund, Tjønnfoss, Heimdøl, Skavannsgrova, Årekrokane, Røyrodden, Åraksøya (islet), Raudnes, Sandvikland, Sauodden, Furelund, Midtvann, Sandnes, and Bjønntjønn. Tjørull is another place used for fishing, kayaking and camping. It is Nissedal's second-largest lake (only Nisser is larger).

Another attraction is the Nissedal Potholes (Jettegrytene). Carved during the Ice Age, the giant's kettle functions as a water park during summer months. The potholes are located at Eikhom and is a tourist destination during summers. The area is used for picnicking, swimming, and there are areas to slide down the riverbed as well as mountain ledges suited for jumping. After the river here was dammed for the production of power, the potholes were revealed and have since been a popular bathing destination.

Places of interest
 
 Gautefall, largest ski resort in Telemark County.
 Nisser Lake, 7th-largest lake in Norway.
 Treungen, village and administrative center for Nissedal.
 Nissedal Potholes, potholes functioning as a water park during summer.
 Fjoneferja, Norway's smallest cable ferry, connecting the west- and east sides of Nisser Lake. 
 Skuggenatten, mountain peak and Treungen landmark. It is one of Nissedal's most visited mountains.
 Hægefjell, 1021 meter (3350 ft.) high mountain with fifty hiking trails. One of Norway's most popular sites for mountain climbing. Featured in the TV series 71 Degrees North.
 Heimdalsheia, the site with the largest continuous slopes of naked rocks (svaberg) in Northern Europe.
 Kvithamar and Trontveit, ancient rock paintings by Lake Nisser.

Wildlife
In 2014 two reindeer were photographed, apparently roaming in the municipality. Reindeer are often observed near Fjone.

More commonly encountered wildlife includes the Mountain hare, European badger, European beaver, Roe deer, Red deer, Elk, Red fox, European hedgehog, Wolverine, Short-tailed weasel, European otter, European pine marten and Norway lemming. More rare but occasionally encountered are the Gray wolf, Eurasian lynx and Brown bear. Avifauna includes raptors such as various species of owls, eagles, falcons, and hawks, including the Western Osprey.

Brown bears were common throughout the 1800s and early 1900s, and a number of place names derives from this, including Bjønntjønn, Bjortjønn, Bjørnåsen, Bjønndalsåsen, Bjønndalane, Bjorvatnet, and Bjønnsteinen. The last bear to be shot in Tørdal was by Bjønnsteinen in February 1911. Olav Tverrstøyl of Åmli shot a total of eight bears at Horgevika. The last bear to be shot in this area was by Landtaksdammen in 1920 by Jon Kraakenes of Vrådal. The last certified observation of bears in Nissedal happened in the summer of 2000 at Lauvlunden. The last documented person to be killed by bear in Nissedal was Hæge Kyrkjebø in July 1832.

A felling license is required by the municipality for wildlife such as Moose, Red deer, Roe deer, and Mountain reindeer. Hunting is particularly popular among Nissedal's southern border to Gjerstad where small game, deer and beavers are regularly hunted. Rabbit hunting is common in Ljosvassteigen on the border to Gjerstad and Vegårshei. Gjerstadskogene by Solhomfjell is a popular destination for those hunting birds, rabbits, beavers, and deer.

Notable natives 

 Jacob Gløersen (1852-1912) painter of unsentimental images of Norwegian peasants
 Paul Tjøstolsen Sunde (1896-1958), parliamentarian from the Labour Party 1945-1953
 Torkell Tande (1901-2001), priest/provost, parliamentarian for the Liberal Party 1954-1969
 Dagny Tande Lid (1903-1998), painter, illustrator and poet
 Johannes Setekleiv (1927-2017), medical researcher, professor (neuropharmacology) at University of Oslo (UiO)
 Eldrid Nordbø (born 1942), parliamentarian, Minister of Trade and Shipping 1990-91
 Sigvald Oppebøen Hansen (born 1950), parliamentarian for the Labour Party 1993-2013

References

Sources 
 Cleasby, Richard and Vigfusson, Gudbrand (1874). Icelandic-English Dictionary. Oxford: Clarendon Press.
 Stemshaug, Ola (1973). Norsk stadnamngransking. Samlaget. 

 
Municipalities of Vestfold og Telemark